The Northcote Tigers are a rugby league club based in Northcote, New Zealand. The club was founded in 1910 as the Northcote Warriors though they became known as the Northcote Ramblers shortly afterwards.

The Tigers compete in the Fox Memorial competition run by the Auckland Rugby League. Between 2000 and 2002 the Northcote Tigers competed in the national Bartercard Cup before being replaced by the North Harbour Tigers for three seasons. In 1994–1996 the North Harbour Sea Eagles in the Lion Red Cup were also based at the Birkenhead War Memorial.

History

In 1909 some members of the North Shore rugby were so impressed with the new type of football they had seen that they decided to found a club for the 1910 season. Thus in 1910 the Northcote "Ramblers" League Football Club was born. It wasn't until 1948 however that the club qualified for the first grade and earned 'senior' status. In 1987 they finally won the Fox Memorial championship, under the coaching of David Harding.

Notable players
Probably the club's greatest product was former Kiwi's halfback Gary Freeman. Other famous players to play for the Tigers include Sean Hoppe, Jason Lowrie, Gene Ngamu, Paul Rauhihi, Tony Tuimavave and former New Zealand Warrior Kevin Locke.

Kiwi representatives
Thirteen players have played for the New Zealand national rugby league team:
Tom Conroy: 1975
Gary Freeman: 1986-92, 1994-95
Tom Hadfield: 1956-61
Frank Halloran: 1937
Sean Hoppe: 1992-99, 2002
Len Jordan: 1946-49
Josh Liavaa: 1975
Jason Lowrie: 1993-95, 1999-2000
Gene Ngamu: 1993-99
John O'Sullivan: 1971-72, 1974-75
Paul Rauhihi: 2002-04
Paddy Tuimavave: 1990
Tony Tuimavave: 1995
Alex Glenn: 2012
Kevin Locke: 2011

The club has also had many Auckland representatives, including Shane Horo, Stuart Galbraith, Brian McLennan, Logan Campbell, Latham Tawhai, Mark Elia, Ken McIntosh, and Willie Poching.

Bartercard Cup

With the creation of the Bartercard Cup in 2000 by the New Zealand Rugby League the Tigers were one of the seven Auckland sides invited to join. However they did not experience that much success, failing to make the top five in three successive attempts.

*two points for a Bye as the Ngongotaha Chiefs dropped out of the competition.

North Harbour Tigers

In 2003 the Bartercard Cup Franchise was renamed the North Harbour Tigers. The new side represented all of the North Shore teams and not just the Northcote club. It experienced a some success in its three-year history, making the top five twice, both times losing in the Elimination Semi-final.

Harbour League

In 2006 the number of Auckland Bartercard Cup sides was reduced from eight to five. This resulted in the North Harbour Tigers and the Hibiscus Coast Raiders leaving the competition and being replaced by the Harbour League franchise.

Northcote and Birkenhead Senior Team Records (1910-1943 +2022)
The season record for the most senior men’s team in the club.

References

External links
 Official website
 Auckland Rugby League

 
Rugby clubs established in 1910
1910 establishments in New Zealand